Khandala station is local station for Khandala town, a twin hill stations of Lonavla – Khandala, in Pune district in state of Maharashtra in India.

 
Khandala Ghat starts after this station towards Mumbai.

Trains

 11007/08 Deccan Express
 11009/10 Sinhagad Express
 11019/20 Konark Express
 11023/24 Sahyadri Express
 11029/30 Koyna Express
 11301/02 Udyan Express
 12115/16 Siddheshwar Express
 12125/26 Pragati Express
 12701/02 Hussainsagar Express
 17411/12 Mahalaxmi Express
 22105/06 Indrayani Express
 22107/08 Latur Express
 51033/34 Shirdi Fast Passenger

Passengers

Pune– Passenger
Pune–Mumbai Passenger
Mumbai–Bijapur Passenger
Mumbai–Pandharpur Passenger
Mumbai–Shirdi Passenger

Pune Suburban Railway
Lonavala-Khandala
Railway stations in Pune district
Pune railway division
Buildings and structures in Lonavala-Khandala
Kalyan-Lonavala rail line